Stomopteryx xanthobasalis is a moth of the family Gelechiidae. It was described by Anthonie Johannes Theodorus Janse in 1963. It is found in South Africa.

References

Endemic moths of South Africa
Moths described in 1963
Stomopteryx